"Wind of Change" is a song by West German rock band Scorpions, recorded for their eleventh studio album, Crazy World (1990). The power ballad was composed and written by the band's lead singer Klaus Meine and produced by Keith Olsen and the band. The lyrics were composed by Meine following the band's visit to the Soviet Union at the height of perestroika, when the enmity between the communist and capitalist blocs subsided concurrently with the promulgation of large-scale socioeconomic reforms in the Soviet Union.

"Wind of Change" was released as the album's third single on 21 January 1991 and became a worldwide hit, just after the failed coup that would eventually lead to the end of the Soviet Union. The song topped the charts in Germany and across Europe and peaked at number four in the United States and at number two in the United Kingdom. It later appeared on the band's 1995 live album Live Bites, their 2000 album with the Berlin Philharmonic Orchestra, Moment of Glory, and on their 2001 "unplugged" album Acoustica. The band also recorded a Russian-language version of the song, under the title "" ("Veter Peremen") and a Spanish version called "" "(Winds of Change)".

With estimated sales of 14 million copies sold worldwide, "Wind of Change" is one of the best-selling singles of all time. It holds the record for the best-selling single by a German artist. The band presented a gold record and $70,000 of royalties from the single to Mikhail Gorbachev in 1991, with Soviet news sources claiming the money would be allocated to children's hospitals.

Background and writing 
Klaus Meine said in an interview that the time 1988/1989 in the Soviet Union was characterized by the mood that the Cold War was coming to an end, the music was the unifying factor between the peoples. The memories of this time are also transported in the music video for the song. Meine was inspired by his participation in the Moscow Music Peace Festival on 13 August 1989, at Lenin Stadium, where the Scorpions performed in front of about 300,000 fans:

The lyrics celebrate glasnost in the Soviet Union, the end of the Cold War, and speak of hope at a time when tense conditions had arisen due to the fall of Communist-run governments among Eastern Bloc nations beginning in 1989. The opening lines refer to the city of Moscow's landmarks:
I follow the Moskva
Down to Gorky Park
Listening to the wind of change

The Moskva is the name of the river that runs through Moscow (both the city and the river are named identically in Russian), and Gorky Park is an urban park in Moscow named after the writer Maxim Gorky. The song also contains a reference to the balalaika, which is a Russian stringed instrument somewhat like a guitar. The balalaika is mentioned in the following lines:

Let your balalaika sing
What my guitar wants to say

Klaus Meine and Rudolf Schenker are owners of the trade mark Wind of Change.

Composition 
"Wind of Change" opens with a clean guitar introduction played by Matthias Jabs, which is played alongside Klaus Meine's flat whistle. The song's guitar solo is played by Rudolf Schenker.

Claim of CIA creative input 
The song is the subject of the Pineapple Street Studios podcast Wind of Change, released 11 May 2020, which raises questions regarding the song's origin. Patrick Radden Keefe, the New Yorker author and host of the podcast investigates the allegation that the song was written by or connected to the Central Intelligence Agency, citing a rumor originating allegedly from inside the agency. In a Sirius XM interview with Eddie Trunk on 13 May 2020, Meine stated "It's a fascinating idea, and it's an entertaining idea, but it's not true at all". In December 2020, it was reported that a further investigation of the song's origins based on the claims from the podcast will be adapted into a series for Hulu directed by Alex Karpovsky.

Legacy 
The song became associated with the Revolutions of 1989 and the Fall of the Berlin Wall also in 1989 and was performed by the Scorpions at the Brandenburg Gate on 9 November 1999, during the 10th anniversary of the Fall of the Berlin Wall.
In 2005, viewers of the German television network ZDF chose this song as the song of the century. "Wind of Change" is featured in the films In Search of a Midnight Kiss (2007), Gentlemen Broncos (2009), The Interview (2014), and Love Island (2014), and the video game SingStar Rocks! (2006). The song can be heard in the opening scene of the action comedy film The Spy Who Dumped Me (2018). The song is also featured in television shows Melrose Place, Chuck, and Car Share and Nutri Ventures parody version.

As of 2022, the Scorpions still perform the song live but with lyrical changes in light of the 2022 Russian invasion of Ukraine. The opening lines are changed to "Now listen to my heart / It says Ukraine, waiting for the wind to change." Meine stated, "It's not the time with this terrible war in Ukraine raging on, it's not the time to romanticize Russia."

In February 2023, the official music video hit one billion views on YouTube.

Track listings 

European 7-inch single
A. "Wind of Change" – 5:10
B. "Restless Nights" – 5:44

European maxi-CD single
 "Wind of Change" – 5:10
 "Restless Nights" – 5:44
 "Big City Nights" (live) – 5:10

UK CD single
 "Wind of Change"
 "To Be with You in Heaven"
 "Blackout" (live)

US and Canadian 7-inch single
A. "Wind of Change" – 5:10
B. "Money and Fame" – 5:06

Charts

Weekly charts

Year-end charts

Certifications and sales

Release history

See also 
 Glasnost
 Perestroika
 Demokratizatsiya (Soviet Union)
 Brandenburger Tor

References

External links 
 

1990 songs
1991 singles
1990s ballads
Anti-war songs
Cold War in popular culture
Dutch Top 40 number-one singles
European Hot 100 Singles number-one singles
Glam metal ballads
Hard rock ballads
Mercury Records singles
Number-one singles in Austria
Number-one singles in Germany
Number-one singles in Norway
Number-one singles in Sweden
Number-one singles in Switzerland
Protest songs
Reactions to the 2022 Russian invasion of Ukraine
Revolutions of 1989
Scorpions (band) songs
SNEP Top Singles number-one singles
Song recordings produced by Keith Olsen
Songs about Russia
Songs written by Klaus Meine
Vertigo Records singles